Virbhadra Temple is dedicated to Lord Shiva, located at Virbhadra Town near Rishikesh, Uttarakhand. It is a 1,300-year-old temple, where Virbhadra, an avatar of Lord Shiva is worshiped. Night long jagran and special poojas are held on the occasion of Shivratri & Sawaan. A mela is also held to coincide with the Mahashivratri festival. Virbhadra Temple Myths and Legends Virabhadra is an avatar of Lord Shiva who was created by him in anger. The story in Hindu mythology describes that when Goddess Uma (Sati) felt insulted by her father Daksh Prajapati at Kankhal, Haridwar for not inviting her husband Lord Shiva for Yagya, she jumped into the Yagya Kund to immolate herself for her husband's dishonor. When Lord Shiva heard this news he became angry, pulled out his hair and thrashed on the ground. Consequently, Lord Virbhadra was born.

The temple is located 2 km from Neelanth-Rishikesh Highway. It can be reached by local Veerbhadra railway station on the highway which is 2 km away from the temple. Nearby villages are Meera Nagar and Tehri Vishtapit. Jolly Grant Airport, Dehradun is 25 km away.

References

Temples in Uttarakhand